The 2015 Pan American Aerobic Gymnastics Championships were held in Oaxtepec, Mexico, December 13–19, 2015. The competition was organized by the Mexican Gymnastics Federation, and approved by the International Gymnastics Federation.

Participating countries

Medalists

References

Pan American Aerobic Gymnastics Championships
Pan American Gymnastics Championships
International gymnastics competitions hosted by Mexico
Pan American Aerobic Gymnastics Championships
Pan American Aerobic Gymnastics Championships